"" was the national anthem of Seychelles from 1976 until 1978.

See also
 Fyer Seselwa

References

African anthems
Seychellois music
National symbols of Seychelles